Augen is the German word meaning eyes.

It may refer to:

 Augen, large, lenticular eye-shaped mineral grains or aggregates visible in metamorphic rocks.
 Augen Bluffs, a group of rock bluffs named after the mineral along the Marsh Glacier, Antarctica.
"Augen auf!", 2004 single from the German industrial metal group Oomph!'s album Wahrheit oder Pflicht
 Augen I (1884–1975), fourth Indian Catholicose of the Malankara Orthodox Syrian Church